Conchamarca District is one of eight districts of the province Ambo in Peru.

See also 
 Pichqaqucha

References